

Hackett
Hackett is a former pilot of the Royal Air Force who later became a henchman of the heroin manufacturer China White. 

China conducted her business from an island volcano in Fiji, and communicated her orders to Hackett from there. Decade ago, Hackett insinuated his way into the lifestyle of millionaire playboy Oliver Queen. He convinced him to invest in several illegal offshore accounts, though Queen was unaware that the money was being used for drug trafficking.

Hackett arranged to meet China White, but Oliver insisted on coming along and they both embarked upon the "Pacific Ocean" ship. Queen's presence threatened to expose China White's operations, and she ordered Hackett to kill him. As he considered himself Oliver's friend, Hackett couldn't bring himself to murder him in cold blood, so he tossed him over the side of the ship instead.

Ollie survived however and encountered Hackett again in Fiji where he learned that he was actually working for China White. The two fought one another, but Ollie managed to get away. When Hackett reported back to China White, she was furious at him for not shooting him in the head as originally instructed.

Hackett in other media
Two characters loosely based on Hackett, David "Dave" Hackett and his son Sam Hackett, appeared in Arrow, portrayed by Ben Cotton and Luke Camilleri respectively. The former worked as a bodyguard for Robert Queen while the latter is a former minor criminal and electrical engineer. In flashbacks depicted in the season one episodes "Pilot" and "Sacrifice" and the season seven episode "Level Two", Dave accompanied Robert on his yacht, the Queen's Gambit, as part of a business trip to China. However, the ship sank and Dave, Robert, and Robert's son Oliver were left adrift on a raft until Robert killed Dave and himself to ensure Oliver's survival. Twelve years later, in the episode "Past Sins", Sam hacks the DA office's computer and obtains unredacted transcripts of Oliver's therapy sessions, through which Sam discovers his father's fate and plots revenge on Oliver. After Sam hacks Star City's power grid, Oliver attempts to calm him by telling his side of the story, but Sam refuses to stand down until Dinah Drake destroys Sam's machine and Sam is arrested.

Jack Haly
Jack Haly (also known as C.C. Haly) is the ringmaster of Haly's Circus. When the circus came to Gotham City, Haly is confronted by Tony Zucco and Edward Skeevers who demand protection money from the Circus as well as the use of their trucks to transport drugs. When Mr. Haly refuses to give into their threats, Zucco and Skeevers sabotage the trapezes of the Circus' most popular act, the Flying Graysons. This causes the John and Mary to plunge to their deaths, leaving their son Dick Grayson orphaned. Afterwards, Mr. Haly paid the protection money to avoid further incidents. Bruce Wayne assists the Circus on behalf of Grayson, who he adopts, helping to expose Zucco's part in the tragedy and free the Circus from the threat.

Jack Haly in other media
 Jack Haly appears in the two-part Batman: The Animated Series episode "Robin's Reckoning", voiced by an uncredited Ed Gilbert. When Tony Zucco demands protection money from Mr. Haly, Tony Zucco sabotages the trapeze set which leads to the death of John and Mary Grayson. Haly allows Bruce to take Dick in since Zucco would go after the other performers. He and the rest of the circus performers see Dick off.
 Jack Haley appears in the Young Justice episode "Fears", voiced by Stephen Root. Haly owned the circus, but he also performed as the ringmaster. He loved all the performers and considered them family and to young Dick Grayson, he was the closest thing to a grandfather. In 2006, crime boss Zucco tried to extort money from him. Haly refused as he ran an honest business, but it would cost him dearly. Zucco sabotaged the trapeze rig of the Flying Graysons, killing Dick's mother, father, aunt, and cousin and paralyzing Dick's uncle. Four years later, his European tour had several problems: a string of high-end technology robberies took place on exactly the same dates as the circus' shows in those cities, putting Haly and his acts under suspicion from Interpol agent King Faraday; and a "flu" (actually the effect of the Parasite's feeding process) went around among the performers, which caused Haly's top act to miss a show in Paris. Haly took on a new act, a trapeze team calling themselves the Daring Dangers (an alias used by the Team). Seeing the Daring Dangers in action made Haly realize that the youngest, Dan Danger, was actually his old star Dick Grayson. He looked at his performance and progress with a sense of pride. Haly dismissed Carlo and his brother's complaints about being dropped from the top slot in favor of the Daring Dangers and their assertion that the Dangers were not siblings as they claimed. When another robbery took place on the night of the show, King Faraday interrogated Haly again. Wishing to protect his own people, he lied to Faraday that he had done a bed check on all his performers. The Interpol agent made it clear that he would shut the circus down if he found out Haly was involved. As the circus left Bruges, Ray the Roustabout attacked Haly and tied him up. Haly was not discovered until the train was well underway to Geneva. Following the arrest of Parasite, the Dangers left the tour. Haly told Dan he knew all along who he really was and asked him to do one final performance, which the latter accepted.
 Jack Haly makes a cameo in the final scenes of Batman: Return of the Caped Crusaders. His design is similar to the Young Justice version.

Hank Hall

Harlequin

Harlequin's Son
Harlequin's Son is a fictional character appearing in American comic books published by DC Comics.

In his panel seen within the pages of "The New Golden Age" one-shot, Michael Mayne is the son of the Molly Mayne version of Harlequin through an unknown man where he has a complicated relationship with her. When Michael was in his 20s, he took one of his mother's illusion-creating glasses, made his own costume, and assaulted a gay bar while hunting down the men who previously put him in the hospital. One of these people pulled a gun on his accomplice and blamed it on "Harlequin's Son". While he turned to a life a crime afterwards, he did inherit his mother's altruistic streak. Thanks to his mother, Harlequin's Son was cleared of the murder charge. Outside of his identity, Michael became an actor and starred in "Dusk Before Dawn" where he portrayed Carver Colman. On the day when Sylvester Pemberton established Infinity, Inc., Michael was approached to join them only to decline stating that he has retired from the superhero work. While Harlequin's Son hasn't been seen again, rumors have it that he was glimpsed during the "Crisis on Infinite Earths" and "Dark Crisis". By the final issue of "Flashpoint Beyond", Harlequin's Son was among the thirteen missing Golden Age superheroes in the Time Masters' capsules. When those capsules have failed, they were all pulled back to their own time with history rebuilding around them.

Harley Quinn

Harry Stein

Harvey Bullock

Hat

The Hat is a wannabe superhero in the DC Universe. Rampotatek hailed from Japan and had access to a magic hat powered by a demon. He was recruited by Manchester Black to join his team of heroes known as the Elite. The Hat and the team's violent actions led them into conflict with Superman. He and the rest of the team were defeated and stripped of their powers.

Hat in other media
 The Hat appears in the Supergirl live-action television series, portrayed by Louis Ozawa Changchien. This version is an alien whose namesake utilizes fifth dimensional energy as it previously belonged to Mister Mxyzptlk, "an old drinking buddy" of Hat's. In the episodes "What's So Funny About Truth, Justice and the American Way?" and "Stand and Deliver", Hat escapes from prison and joins the Elite in attacking the Fortress of Solitude and Ben Lockwood. However, Supergirl and the Department of Extranormal Operations repel the latter attack and take Hat into custody.
 The Hat appears in the animated film Superman vs. The Elite, voiced by Andrew Kishino.

Hauhet
Hauhet is the fictonalized version of the Egyptian entity of the same name, appearing in American comic books published by DC Comics.  A contemporay of Nabu in association with Doctor Fate, she acts as the patron deity within the Helm of Fate to Khalid Nassour. She first appears in Future State: Justice League #1 within an alternate future parallel to the mainstream comic universe although she would later make her mainstream  appearance in Justice League Dark Annual #2 (2022).

In the Future State event, after the fall of the Tower of Fate through Merlin and a unrevealed mage, Khalid seeks to repair the broken Helm of Fate (depicted as being damaged due to the events of A Costly Trick of Magic storyline). Meeting her in person for the first time, she reveals herself to be a ally of Nabu and repairs the Helm of Fate, allowing Khalid the power to see and live through timeline while bearing the Helm of Fate. 

In the mainsteam comic universe, Hauhet makes a brief appearance, the aforementioned event taking place years after; she  is revealed to be the entity responsible for sending visions to Khalid Nassour, depicting the fall of the Tower of Fate through the machinations of Merlin and Arion. Upon further study, Khalid also learns that Merlin will bargain a deal with Jason Blood, in which will lead to him betraying Justice Leage Dark and himself despite insisting otherwise. She later arranges a meeting with Diana through Doctor Fate's ankhs, having Diana act as a messenger for the urgency of the situation and warning him and the Justice League Dark to not allow Merlin access to the Helm of Fate. Both Wonder Woman and Khalid are initially skeptical of her nature and intentions.

Hawk

Hawkgirl

Hawkman

Hawkwoman

Head

The Head is an alien in the DC Universe. The character, created by Gail Simone and Grant Morrison, first appeared in Brave New World #1.

Within the context of the stories, the Head is stranded on Earth after a failed plot by the microscopic alien race the Waiting to conquer it.

Headhunter
There have been two different characters named the Headhunter in DC Comics.

Mercenary
Within the context of the stories, the Headhunter is a mercenary and nemesis of Batman.

The Headhunter first appeared attempting to kill Commissioner Gordon.

During the DC Rebirth reboot, the Headhunter murdered the Swamp Thing's father. Batman and the Swamp Thing investigated, discovering that he was responsible. To Batman's horror, the Swamp Thing murdered the Headhunter.

Hawkman villain
Within the context of the stories, the Headhunter was a warrior shaman who used Nth metal weapons. He developed a particular fascination with Hawkman, to the point of reanimating the bones of his previous incarnations.

Headhunter in other media
A variation of the Headhunter appears in the Gotham episode "A Dark Knight: A Day in the Narrows", portrayed by Kyle Vincent Terry. This version has the real name of Wendell. Just like the comics, the Headhunter has a habit of shooting his victims twice: the first shot to kill the person and the second one as his signature, since he never missed the first shot to the head. At the time when Victor Zsasz was out of town, he recommended his old friend the Headhunter to Oswald Cobblepot to be his replacement security counsel until his return. The Headhunter accompanied Cobblepot when he and his group assisted the Gotham City Police Department into hunting Professor Pyg in the Narrows. Upon both groups falling into Professor Pyg's trap, the Headhunter got wounded until James Gordon destroyed the trap. After falling back to the Iceberg Lounge due to Professor Pyg having gotten away, the Headhunter stated to Cobblepot that Gordon is right. This causes Cobblepot to stab the Headhunter in the neck with the knife concealed in his cane and then stab him in the chest, stating to the Headhunter that this was his signature. In the episode "A Dark Knight: The Sinking Ship, The Grand Applause", the Headhunter gets out of the hospital, where he now wears an eyepatch and meets Sofia Falcone at the time when Victor Zsasz brings him to raid Arkham Asylum to target Cobblepot, only for him to be sprung from Arkham by Edward Nygma. The two of them encounter Gordon and Harvey Bullock on the streets with Cobblepot, which resulted in a gunfight where Cobblepot got away with Leslie Thompkins. When Sofia Falcone brought Zsasz, the Headhunter and some Falcone crime family operatives to Spa Bo'sh Sumka to target Arthur Penn, Zsasz and the Headhunter pursue Bullock and Penn. While the two of them got away in Leslie's car, Zsasz and the Headhunter went out for smoothies when they saw the police cars arriving.

Heat Wave

Hector Hammond

Hellhound
Hellhound is the name of two fictional characters appearing in American comic books published by DC Comics.

Kai
Kai was the best student in the Armless Master's dojo in Gotham City. Kai was also a thief, which brought him into conflict with a young Selina Kyle, who "tainted" a religious ceremony he was performing by touching a religious artifact depicting Bast that he had intended to steal himself. After Kai severely beat her for her interference, Kyle followed Kai back to the secret dojo, where the Armless Master welcomed her as a student. She began studying, and quickly showed Kai up in front of his master. Kai soon learned that Selina had taken on the identity of Catwoman, and, in religious zeal, took it as a sign. Adopting the identity of Hellhound he attempted to force Selina to kill him, believing this would finish the ceremony she had interrupted when they first met, and that he would be reborn as a "true hound of hell". Catwoman scarred his face instead, deepening his already great hatred of her.

In the years that followed Kai became a hired mercenary. Eventually he would get his wish and encounter Catwoman once more, coldly informing her that their master had been killed (although Catwoman is apparently unaware that Lady Shiva was the one to kill her sensei). Hellhound and Catwoman were forced to work together by an archeological relic connoisseur called the Collector, who wanted them to find him an artifact called the Wheel of Plagues. On their dismay, the Wheel was also being sought by Ra's al Ghul, and Catwoman and Hellhound were forced into conflict with Bane. Bane bested them and took the Wheel, and the two fought once again. Catwoman again bested Hellhound, leaving him alive even though he again asked for death.

He was later employed by Jackie Pamerjanian, the drug kingpin of Rheelasia, to protect his crop. Hellhound was forced into conflict with another costumed hero, this time Black Canary. She also defeated Hellhound, and Pamerjanian lost his drugs as the government raided the compound. Hellhound was recently seen serving as the bodyguard of Lew Moxon at the summit of Gotham gang bosses, and was unable to save his boss from being killed by Zeiss, who killed him in the process.

Jack Chifford
A second Hellhound has appeared as a member of the supervillain Society in the Villains United mini-series. His real name is Jack Chifford and he bought his 'villain franchise' from the Calculator i.e. Calculator sold him the costume and right to use the name.

This version of Hellhound was among the exiled villains. In Salvation Run #2, he was badly wounded by an alien creatures. His fellow villains were ready to abandon him, but the Body Doubles insisted he be brought along. They later feed him to a group of "Lion-lizards" so that the others could escape.

Hellhound in other media
 Hellhound makes a non-speaking appearance in the Justice League Unlimited episode "Grudge Match" as a minor participant in Roulette's cage matches. 
 Hellhound appeared in Batman: Bad Blood as a mute bodyguard to the Heretic.

John Henry

John Wilson, also known as John Henry, is a fictional DC Comics superhero.

John Henry was a veteran of the Korean War. After the conflict, Wilson discharged and took work in a local machine shop and settled down in Knoxville, Tennessee with his wife Lucille and baby daughter Loretta. On the night of March 17, 1955, John and his family were attacked by the local Ku Klux Klan. He was lynched and his family was burned to death. After the Klan left, John survived his lynching. Devastated by the death of his family and the police blaming him for the murders, John followed the Klan members. John then forged two 20 lb. iron sledgehammers, donned an executioner's hood, and became the vigilante known as John Henry. For three months, John plagued the Klan and had killed two Klansmen in his crusade. John Henry's reputation attracted the news media and remained a hot staple on the public, including the Martian J'onn J'onzz, who considered him an actual American hero. Tragically, John was wounded by the Klan and stumbled into a backyard. He was discovered by a young white girl, who outed him out despite John's pleading for help. Once caught, he was burned alive.

However, his death didn't go unmentioned and his endeavors was highlighted in the television news show The Big Picture which its host extolled Wilson's stance against racism and criticized the American government for ignoring the serious issue. J'onn J'onzz saw this and was very dismayed of Wilson's death which contributed his demoralizing faith for humanity.

Following the defeat of The Centre, a young John Henry Irons sat reading near John Wilson's gravestone.

John Henry in other media
John Henry appeared in Justice League: The New Frontier. His tombstone was seen during the film's final scenes.

John Henry Jr.
John Henry Jr. is a fictional character appearing in American comic books published by DC Comics.

In his panel within the pages of "The New Golden Age" #1, John Henry Irons has a great-uncle who has the same name as him. When John and his brother Butter witnessed the Ku Klux Klan set fire to the house of their neighbor John Wilson and killed his family, the police accused Wilson for murdering his own family and starting the fire himself. He had heard about the vigilante John Henry being killed by Ku Klux Klan. Upon receiving one of his sledgehammers from an unnamed old man, John Henry Irons became John Henry Jr. While it was said by the old man that he would have more power when he wielded two sledgehammers, John Henry Jr. never found the other sledgehammer. He would later go missing a week later after his first gig that involved bringing the last of John Henry's murderers to justice. By the final issue of "Flashpoint Beyond", John Henry Jr. was among the thirteen missing Golden Age superheroes in the Time Masters' capsules. When those capsules have failed, they were all pulled back to their own time with history rebuilding around them.

John Henry Jr. was among the Lost Children on Childminder's island. He mentioned to Stargirl that he was looking for the second of John Henry's sledgehammers when he ended up on this island.

Hippolyta

Cecile Horton
Cecile Horton is a fictional character appearing in American comic books published by DC Comics. She was the defense attorney for Barry Allen / Flash, who was accused of murdering Professor Zoom, in the storyline "The Trial of the Flash".

Cecile Horton in other media
A loose interpretation of Cecile Horton appears in The CW live-action Arrowverse television series The Flash, portrayed by Danielle Nicolet. Introduced as a guest character in season one before becoming a recurring character in seasons three and four and a main character from season five onward, this version is a defense attorney who went on to enter a relationship with Joe West after helping him solve metahuman crimes and helping Barry Allen / Flash on several occasions. In season four, similarly to her comic counterpart, Horton became Allen's defense attorney after he was framed for murder by the Thinker. Additionally, she became pregnant and developed prenatal telepathy, which she used to assist Team Flash in defeating the Thinker. As of season five, once she gave birth, her powers slowly diminished to empathy. In season six, due to her experience as a metahuman, she becomes a defense attorney for metahumans.

Hourman

Human Cannonball

The Human Cannonball (Ryan Chase) is a superhero in the DC Universe. The character, created by Tom DeFalco and Win Mortimer, first appeared in Superman Family #188 (March 1978). Within the context of the stories, the Human Cannonball grew up in the circus and is a friend of Lois Lane. He has no superhuman powers, but can fly using an advanced jet-pack—he wears a cannonball-shaped helmet to allow him to crash into his targets head-on. His costume consists of a green shirt (with a yellow CB emblem) and tights, black pants, black gloves and violet thigh-length boots.

Huntress

Hush

Hyathis

Hyena

The Hyena is the name of two fictional supervillains published by DC Comics. The first Hyena debuted in Firestorm #4 (September 1978) and was created by Gerry Conway and Al Milgrom. The second Hyena debuted in The Fury of Firestorm #10 (March 1983) and was created by Gerry Conway and Pat Broderick.

Both werehyenas had problems with authority and resented Firestorm for interfering in their vendettas. The unique feature of the Hyenas was that they turned into werehyena forms whenever they were under great emotional stress, not only when there was a full moon. This meant that they could attack foes in broad daylight and that they would revert into their human forms when their emotional tension was relieved.

The first Hyena, Summer Day, joined the Peace Corps as a result of relational issues with her father and was turned into a werehyena as a result of an accident in Africa. Taking the name the Hyena, Summer returned to America and began attacking both criminals and police officers. A result of her condition is a steadily progressing madness.

The second Hyena, Doctor Jivan Shi, was a psychiatrist whom Summer Day had fallen in love with while he was attempting to treat her werehyena condition. One night, as Summer and Jivan were embracing, Summer transformed into the Hyena and infected Jivan with the werehyena curse. Professor Stein noted that being the Hyena seemed to have warped Jivan Shi's mind. According to The Fury of Firestorm #10–13, the madness suffered by the werehyenas is one's bestial side taking over, coupled with an exaggeration of negative emotions.

In Infinite Crisis, Deadshot killed one of the Hyenas after a prison breakout and the other appeared as a member of the Injustice League in One Year Later before being shot and killed by Parademons that were attacking the villains' camp.

A pack of at least five new werehyenas, presumably suffering from the same curse as Summer and Jivan, were seen in San Francisco some time after the death of their remaining predecessor. They were promptly defeated and permanently returned to human form thanks to Zatanna, the Vixen and the Black Canary.

In 2011, The New 52 rebooted the DC universe. The Hyenas are reintroduced as mercenaries who received special drugs that gave them super-strength and super-velocity, with the side effect of a constant laugh.

During the Forever Evil storyline as part of The New 52, the Summer Day version of the Hyena appears as a member of the Secret Society of Super Villains. The Crime Syndicate sent the Hyena with Black Bison, Multiplex, Plastique and Typhoon to finish Gorilla Grodd's job. The villains were defeated by the Rogues, since one of the targets was the hospital that was treating Captain Cold's sister.

References

 DC Comics characters: H, List of